Ali Mohammad Yari is a Paralympian athlete from Iran competing mainly in category F56 discus throw events.

He competed in the 2008 Summer Paralympics in Beijing, China. There he won a silver medal in the men's F55-56 discus throw event. Four years later he reached the podium again, winning bronze in the discus at the 2012 Summer Paralympics in London.

External links
 

Paralympic athletes of Iran
Athletes (track and field) at the 2008 Summer Paralympics
Paralympic silver medalists for Iran
Living people
Medalists at the 2008 Summer Paralympics
Medalists at the 2012 Summer Paralympics
Athletes (track and field) at the 2012 Summer Paralympics
Athletes (track and field) at the 2016 Summer Paralympics
Paralympic bronze medalists for Iran
Iranian male discus throwers
Year of birth missing (living people)
Paralympic medalists in athletics (track and field)
21st-century Iranian people